Robertson DeShawn Daniel (born October 1, 1991) is a professional gridiron football defensive back for the Toronto Argonauts of the Canadian Football League (CFL). He played college football at BYU. Daniel was signed by the Oakland Raiders as an undrafted free agent in 2015. He has also been a member of the Green Bay Packers, Washington Redskins, Baltimore Ravens, and Calgary Stampeders.

College career
Daniel attended Brigham Young University, where he played for coach Bronco Mendenhall's BYU Cougars football team in 2013 and 2014 after transferring from De Anza College.

Statistics
Source: BYUCougars.com

Professional career

Oakland Raiders
After going undrafted in the 2015 NFL Draft, Daniel signed with the Oakland Raiders on May 8, 2015. On September 1, 2015, he was waived by the Raiders.

Green Bay Packers
On September 7, 2015, Daniel was signed to the Green Bay Packers' practice squad. He was promoted from the practice squad to the active roster on January 15, 2016. However, Daniel was inactive for the Packers' divisional playoff game against the Arizona Cardinals the following day.

He was released by the Packers during final team cuts on September 3, 2016. On September 22, 2016, Daniel was signed to the Packers' practice squad. He was released from the Packers' practice squad on September 27, 2016.

Washington Redskins
On October 3, 2016, Daniel was signed to the Washington Redskins' practice squad. He was released from the Redskins' practice squad on October 11, 2016.

Baltimore Ravens
Daniel was signed to the Baltimore Ravens' practice squad on October 13, 2016. On October 22, 2016, he was promoted from the practice squad to the active roster. He was released by the Ravens on November 5, 2016 and was re-signed to the practice squad. He signed a reserve/future contract with the Ravens on January 5, 2017.

On September 2, 2017, Daniel was waived/injured by the Ravens and placed on injured reserve. He was released on September 7, 2017. He was re-signed to the practice squad on December 5, 2017. He signed a reserve/future contract with the Ravens on January 2, 2018. He was waived by the Ravens on May 3, 2018.

On August 27, 2018, Daniel was re-signed by the Ravens, only to be waived four days later. He was re-signed to the practice squad on September 3, 2018. He was promoted to the active roster on September 22, 2018, but was waived two days later and re-signed back to the practice squad. He signed a reserve/future contract with the Ravens on January 8, 2019. He was waived on May 6, 2019.

Calgary Stampeders
On May 25, 2019, Daniel signed with the Calgary Stampeders to a two-year contract. He played in eight regular season games where he recorded 21 defensive tackles, six special teams tackles, and three interceptions. He did not play in 2020 due to the cancellation of the 2020 CFL season.

Toronto Argonauts
As a pending free agent entering the 2021 CFL season, Daniel's playing rights were traded to the Toronto Argonauts on January 31, 2021. He re-signed with the Argonauts three days later.

Statistics
Source: NFL.com

References

External links
 Toronto Argonauts bio
 Baltimore Ravens bio
 
 BYU Cougars bio
 

1991 births
Living people
United States Virgin Islands players of American football
People from Saint Thomas, U.S. Virgin Islands
Sportspeople from Brooklyn
Players of American football from New York City
American football safeties
American football cornerbacks
De Anza Dons football players
BYU Cougars football players
Oakland Raiders players
Green Bay Packers players
Washington Redskins players
Baltimore Ravens players
Calgary Stampeders players
Toronto Argonauts players